Adama Diakité (born 7 March 1991) is a French professional footballer who plays as a striker for Marignane GCB FC.

Career 
Paris-born Diakité began playing football for Red Star 93. He joined the youth team of RC Lens in 2008, and made his senior debut for the reserve team in a Championnat de France amateur match on 16 August 2008 against US Sénart-Moissy. In the following three years, he played for the reserve side, before making his professional debut for RC Lens on 14 September 2012 in a Ligue 2 game against LB Châteauroux. Then, he participated in seven games more as a substitute in the 2012–13 season for the first team of RC Lens. He played 104 games and scored 19 goals for the Lens reserves, before he was released from his contract by the club.

In January 2014, after remaining a free agent for half a year, he signed a contract until the end of the 2013–14 season with German 2. Bundesliga club SV Sandhausen.

References

External links
 

Living people
1991 births
French sportspeople of Malian descent
French footballers
French expatriate footballers
Footballers from Paris
Association football forwards
Ligue 2 players
Championnat National 2 players
Championnat National 3 players
2. Bundesliga players
RC Lens players
SV Sandhausen players
Wasquehal Football players
FC Villefranche Beaujolais players
FC Martigues players
FC Istres players
Marignane Gignac Côte Bleue FC players
French expatriate sportspeople in Germany
Expatriate footballers in Germany